The 2004 Big South Conference football season was the third football season for the Big South Conference. The season began on Saturday, September 4, 2004 and concluded on November 20. The Coastal Carolina Chanticleers won the conference's regular season championship, their first title.

Awards and honors

Conference honors
Offensive Player of the Year: Patrick Hall, Jr., RB, Coastal Carolina
Defensive Player of the Year: Harold Wells, Sr., DL, Gardner–Webb
Freshman of the Year: Jerome Simpson, WR, Coastal Carolina
Scholar-Athlete of the Year: Adam DeGraffenreid, Jr., DE, Charleston Southern
Coach of the Year: David Bennett, Coastal Carolina

All-Conference Teams

Rankings

Head coaches
Jay Mills, Charleston Southern
David Bennett, Coastal Carolina
Steve Patton, Gardner–Webb
Ken Karcher, Liberty
Cal McCombs, VMI

References